K. R. Guruswami Iyer was an Indian lawyer, politician and Indian independence activist from Tinnevely who served as a member of the Madras Legislative Council from 1905 to 1909. He was also one of the early leaders of the Indian National Congress.

Notes 

Year of death missing
Members of the Tamil Nadu Legislative Council
Indian independence activists from Tamil Nadu
Year of birth missing